Ghana women's national under-20 football team represents Ghana in international youth football competitions.

Fixtures and results

 Legend

2022

Head coaches
  Kuuku Dadzie (November 2009 – October 2011)
  Robert Sackey (2011–2014)
  Yusif Basigi ( September 2017–2019)
  Yusif Basigi (November 2020 – May 2021)

Competitive record

FIFA U-20 Women's World Cup record
  2002 - Didn't qualify
  2004 - Didn't qualify
  2006 - Didn't qualify
  2008 - Didn't qualify
  2010 - Group stage
  2012 - Group stage
  2014 - Group stage
  2016 - Group stage
  2018 - Group stage
  2022 - Group stage

African U-20 Cup of Nations for Women
 Home/away 2002 - Didn't enter
 Home/away 2004 - Didn't enter
 Home/away 2006 - Quarter-final
 Home/away 2008 - Semi-final
 Home/away 2010 - Champion 
 Home/away 2012 - Champion 
 Home/away 2014 - Champion 

: with Nigeria

See also
 Ghana women's national football team
 Ghana women's national under-17 football team

References

External links
 Official Ghana Football Association website

under20
African women's national under-20 association football teams